Phạm Nguyên Sa (born 17 January 1989) is a Vietnamese professional footballer who plays as a defensive midfielder for V.League 1 club SHB Đà Nẵng.

Nguyên Sa was born in Da Nang and started his career at SHB Da Nang. He then signed for Than Quang Ninh in October 2016. He made his international debut in 2012 and represented his country at 2012 AFF Championship.

Club career

Than Quang Ninh
Following the 2016 season, Nguyên Sa was released by SHB Da Nang. He signed a 3-year deal with Than Quảng Ninh prior to the start of the 2017 season. He made his debut on 26 February 2017, playing the full 90 minutes as Than Quang Ninh beat Saigon 3–0 at Cẩm Phả Stadium.

Honours

Clubs 
SHB Da Nang
 V.League 1: 2012
 Vietnamese Cup runner-up: 2013

Than Quang Ninh
 Vietnamese Super Cup: 2016

References 

1989 births
Living people
People from Da Nang
Vietnamese footballers
Association football midfielders
SHB Da Nang FC players
Than Quang Ninh FC players
V.League 1 players
Vietnam international footballers